The Handbook of Educational Psychology has been published in three editions, appearing in 1996, 2006, and 2016. Produced by Division 15 of the American Psychological Association (APA), the handbook broadly presents the theories, evidence and methodologies of educational psychology.

References
Corno, L., & Anderman, E. (Eds.) (2016). Handbook of educational psychology (3rd ed.). Florence, US: Routledge.
Alexander, P. A., & Winne, P. H. (Eds.) (2006). Handbook of educational psychology (2nd ed.). Mahwah, NJ: Lawrence Erlbaum Associates.
Berliner, D. C., & Calfee, R. C. (Eds.) (1996). Handbook of educational psychology (1st ed.). Lawrence Erlbaum Associates
.

Educational psychology books